G33, G-33 or G.33 may refer to:
 G33: Civilization is Mind Control (a novel by Lorenzo Rodriguez)
 The former Group of 33 industrialized nations
 The current Group of 33 forum for developing countries that coordinate on trade and economic issues
 The Intel G33 Express Chipset
 Glock 33, a firearm
 A model of Ginetta racing cars
 A variant of the Model 33 Beechcraft Bonanza aircraft